Tropical house, also known as trop house, is a subgenre of house music, and a derivation of tropical music, with elements of dancehall and Balearic house. Artists of the genre are often featured at various summer festivals such as Tomorrowland. The genre was popularized by artists including Thomas Jack, Kygo, Matoma, Lost Frequencies, Seeb and Gryffin.

The term "Tropical House" began as a joke by Australian producer Thomas Jack, but has since gone on to gain popularity among listeners. The term "trouse" should not be confused with tropical house, as "trouse" is a genre that instead combines the feeling of trance and the beats of progressive house, using electro synths.

History
In the mid and late 2000s, Bob Sinclar and Yves Larock created international hits which had many characteristics of tropical house, drawing inspiration from 1980's Hi-NRG music and in contrast with other sub-types of Electronic ("EDM") music of the time. The style was further popularized by Stereo Love, an international hit by Edward Maya, a music producer from the Romanian house scene. In 2012, Unicorn Kid had created tropical rave, a faster form of the genre which would become known as tropical house. However, it was not until 2013 with Klangkarussell's "Sun Don't Shine" and the emergence of producers such as Kygo and Robin Schulz that tropical house became a dance music trend. During 2014 and 2015, producers such as Lost Frequencies, Felix Jaehn, Alex Adair, Sam Feldt, Bakermat, Klingande, Jonas Blue and Faul & Wad Ad would join them with big tropical house hits. During the mid-2010s, certain tropical house producers would team up with artists such as Justin Bieber and Little Mix. This helped the genre achieve massive commercial success and gave rise to the playlist term of 'tropical pop'.

Characteristics 
Tropical house is a derivation of deep house, and a subgenre of house music. Thus, it possesses typical house music characteristics, including synthesizer instrumentation, and a 4/4 kick drum pattern. Tropical house differentiates itself from deep house, which can often have a very dark sound, whereas tropical house can be described as having a more uplifting and relaxing sound.
The tempo of tropical house songs is a little slower than deep house (100-115 bpm). Tropical house does not use the pumping compression effect of "big room" electro house. It usually includes  tropical instruments such as steel drums, marimba, guitar, saxophone or even pan flute, and can sometimes use dembow rhythm patterns often attributed to genres such as dancehall and reggaeton.

See also 
 :Category:Tropical house musicians
 :Category:Tropical house songs
 List of electronic music genres
 Styles of house music
 Future house
 Balearic trance

References 

 
House music genres
2010s in music
21st-century music genres
Australian inventions
Reggae fusion